The TSV 1860 Munich II is the reserve team of German football club TSV 1860 Munich, from the city of Munich, Bavaria.

Until 2005, the team played under the name of TSV 1860 München Amateure. In the 2018–19 season, the team plays in the tier-five Bayernliga Süd.

Within the club, it operates as an under-21 side, designated to develop players from the youth to the first-team stage.

History

1959 to 1963
1860's amateur team first won promotion to Bavarias highest football league, then the tier-three Amateurliga Südbayern, in 1959, when it took out the title in the 2. Amateurliga Oberbayern and then won the Oberbayern final against FSV Pfaffenhofen. The Amateurliga Südbayern was then one of two leagues at this level in Bavaria, covering the southern half of the state while the Amateurliga Nordbayern existed in parallel in the north.

TSV 1860 München Amateure, as the team was then known as, was the third reserve side to reach this level in Bavaria, pre-dated only by 1. FC Nuremberg II and FC Bayern Munich II.

The team finished an excellent second in its first year in the third division, five points behind TSV Schwaben Augsburg. The following season, 1960–61, the team won its league, with Bayern Munich's reserve side coming second. 1860's amateur side was however ineligible for promotion as reserve teams could not rise above third division level. The team also declined participation in the Bavarian championship finals against northern champions 1. FC Haßfurt as nine players had left the side already to join other clubs.

With this loss, the team was uncompetitive the following season, finishing fourteenth in the league and narrowly avoiding relegation. With the reorganisation of the German football league system in 1963, it became part of the new tier-four Landesliga Bayern-Süd after finishing fifteenth in the league when a top-seven finish was needed.

1963 to 1982
In its first season in the Landesliga, 1860 narrowly avoided relegation to the Bezirksliga, finishing twelfth in the league. It turned fortunes around the following season, coming second behind SpVgg Kaufbeuren, but only the champion of the league was promoted in this era. Another runners-up finish followed in 1967, this time to FC Bayern Munich II.

The team finished in mid-field in the following years but suffered another relegation in 1971, now to the tier-five Bezirksliga. The team's decline went in line with the club's first team's relegation from the Bundesliga in 1970.

1860 Amateure returned to the Landesliga in 1973 and earned another runners-up finish in its first year back. In 1976, the team once more was relegated to the Bezirksliga.

The team once more returned from the Bezirksliga in 1980 and finished as runners-up in the Landesliga in 1981-82. Since 1981, the Landesliga runners-up were entitled to participate in a Bayernliga promotion round, but the 1860 club itself was struck by disaster and its reserve team was withdrawn instead. What happened was that TSV 1860 had its 2. Bundesliga licence revoked and was forcefully relegated to the tier-three Amateur Oberliga Bayern, the Bayernliga.

1982 to present
The team started its road to recovery when it won the tier-six Bezirksliga Oberbayern-Süd in 1990, to earn promotion to the Bezirksoberliga Oberbayern. The team missed out on another promotion the following year, when it came equal second in the Bezirksoberliga but lost a decider to FC Miesbach. It took until 1995 for the side to return for another attempt at promotion, when a second-place finish meant a return to the Landesliga.

Back in the Landesliga, the team won another promotion on first try, winning the league and moving up to the Bayernliga for the first time since 1963.

There, 1860 won its fourth promotion in four years, taking out another league title and moving up to the tier-three Regionalliga Süd. The team spend the next four seasons in the Regionalliga, earning mid-table results in its first three seasons, but suffering relegation in 2001.

Three years in the Bayernliga followed, in which the team finished runners-up twice before taking out the title once more in 2004.

Back in the Regionalliga, the side became a struggler against relegation. In 2005, the team, like all reserve sides of Bundesliga and 2. Bundesliga teams, changed its name permanently from Amateure to Second team, becoming TSV 1860 München II. In case of 1860, the team had already carried that name during the first team's time in the Bayernliga.

With the establishment of the 3. Liga in 2008, the Regionalliga slipped to fourth tier, but also lost most of its top teams to the new league. In 2008–09, the team performed much better, finishing sixth in the league. The club enjoyed a very successful 2012–13 season, now in the Regionalliga Bayern, where it won the league championship and qualified for the play-offs to the 3. Liga but missed out on promotion when it lost to SV Elversberg 3–4 on aggregate. The following two seasons the team finished third in the Regionalliga.

Because the first team relegated to 3. Liga and subsequently failed to pay the required license fee in June 2017, they relegated to Regionalliga Bayern and the reserve team, although finishing the 2016–17 season as second, relegated to Bayernliga Süd, the fifth German football tier.

Honours
The club's honours:

League
 Amateurliga Bayern-Süd (III) 
 Champions: 1961
 Regionalliga Bayern (IV)
 Champions: 2013
 Bayernliga (IV) 
 Champions: (2) 1997, 2004
 Runners-up: (2) 2002, 2003
 2. Amateurliga Oberbayern A (IV) 
 Champions: 1959
 Landesliga Bayern-Süd (V) 
 Champions: 1996
 Runners-up: (4) 1965, 1967, 1974, 1982
 Bezirksliga Oberbayern-Ost (V)
 Champions: 1973
 Bezirksoberliga Oberbayern (VI)
 Runners-up: 1995
 Bezirksliga Oberbayern-Süd (VI)
 Champions: 1990

Cup
 Oberbayern Cup 
 Winner: (3) 1997, 1998, 2003

Current squad

Squad

Affiliated First Team

Affiliated U19

Coaching history
List coaches of the club:

Recent seasons
The recent season-by-season performance of the club:

With the introduction of the Bezirksoberligas in 1988 as the new fifth tier, below the Landesligas, all leagues below dropped one tier. With the introduction of the Regionalligas in 1994 and the 3. Liga in 2008 as the new third tier, below the 2. Bundesliga, all leagues below dropped one tier. With the establishment of the Regionalliga Bayern as the new fourth tier in Bavaria in 2012 the Bayernliga was split into a northern and a southern division, the number of Landesligas expanded from three to five and the Bezirksoberligas abolished. All leagues from the Bezirksligas onward were elevated one tier.

References

External links 
Official club site tsv1860.de
Official team site ama-lion.com
1860wiki
TSV 1860 München II profile at Weltfussball.de
Das deutsche Fußball-Archiv historical German domestic league tables 

German reserve football teams
Bavarian reserve football teams
 
Football clubs in Munich